Ian Grojnowski is a mathematician working at the Department of Pure Mathematics and Mathematical Statistics at the University of Cambridge.

Awards and honours
Grojnowski was the first recipient of the Fröhlich Prize of the London Mathematical Society in 2004 for his work in representation theory and algebraic geometry. The citation reads

References

20th-century British mathematicians
21st-century British mathematicians
Australian mathematicians
Living people
Cambridge mathematicians
Year of birth missing (living people)